Olathe is a statutory town in Montrose County, Colorado, United States. The population was 2,019 as of the 2020 census, up from 1,849 at the 2010 census. A post office called Olathe has been in operation since 1896. The community was named after Olathe, Kansas.

Geography
U.S. Route 50 passes through the east side of the town, leading southeast  to Montrose, the county seat, and northwest  to Delta.

The Uncompahgre River passes along the western edge of the town, flowing northwest to the Gunnison River at Delta. Ash Mesa rises  over the town to the west.

Demographics

As of the census of 2000, there were 1,573 people, 520 households, and 383 families residing in the town. The racial makeup of the town was 74.44% White, 0.06% African American, 1.65% Native American, 0.32% Asian, 19.71% from other races, and 3.81% from two or more races. Hispanic or Latino of any race were 35.22% of the population.

There were 520 households, out of which 41.5% had children under the age of 18 living with them, 59.0% were married couples living together, 10.2% had a female householder with no husband present, and 26.3% were non-families. 22.9% of all households were made up of individuals, and 11.7% had someone living alone who was 65 years of age or older. The average household size was 2.88 and the average family size was 3.44.

In the town, the population was spread out, with 31.8% under the age of 18, 10.1% from 18 to 24, 24.7% from 25 to 44, 19.3% from 45 to 64, and 14.0% who were 65 years of age or older. The median age was 31 years. For every 100 females, there were 95.2 males. For every 100 females age 18 and over, there were 87.1 males.

The median income for a household in the town was $26,286, and the median income for a family was $31,354. Males had a median income of $22,708 versus $18,077 for females. The per capita income for the town was $12,620. About 15.9% of families and 21.8% of the population were below the poverty line, including 24.7% of those under age 18 and 19.6% of those age 65 or over.

Transportation

Major highways
  U.S. Route 50 (US 50) runs east-west, crossing 12 states. It links Sacramento, California with Ocean City, Maryland. In Colorado, it connects Olathe to Montrose, Grand Junction and Pueblo. US 50 has a business loop within the town. 
  State Highway 348 is mostly a country road running parallel to US 50. It starts at Fifth Street in Olathe, goes to the countryside and enters Delta via 8th Street/Eaton Avenue.

Attractions

Olathe Sweet Corn Festival
Since 1992, this annual town festival has been held the first Saturday in August each summer, dedicated to the region's "agricultural jewel", Olathe Sweet Corn. The Festival features such entertainment as craft shows, karaoke, local acts, like the Anders Brothers, Cabin Fever Band, and concerts by bigger names like Three Dog Night in 1996, Kansas in 1998, Styx in 2004, LeAnn Rimes in 2007, Travis Tritt in 2008, and Clint Black in 2009. Any proceeds go to local non-profit groups.

Olathe BMX
Olathe BMX was established by the Town of Olathe in 2007 and sanctioned by the American Bicycle Association. Olathe BMX is run by volunteers; self-supporting since its conception in 2007, Olathe BMX has produced several state champions.

Education
Olathe is part of the Montrose County School District RE-1J and has three schools within the town limits. Olathe Elementary School has a population of around 500 students and supports grades K through 5. The middle school and high school are attached and create Olathe Middle High School.

See also

 List of municipalities in Colorado
 Sweet corn
 Old Spanish National Historic Trail

References

External links

 
 The Olathe Messenger, newspaper 
 CDOT map of the Town of Olathe

Towns in Montrose County, Colorado
Towns in Colorado